David Sam (born August 12, 1933) is a senior United States district judge of the United States District Court for the District of Utah.

Education and career

Born on August 12, 1933, in Hobart, Indiana, to parents recently emigrated from Romania, Sam received a Bachelor of Science degree from Brigham Young University in 1957. He received a Juris Doctor from the S.J. Quinney College of Law at the University of Utah in 1960. He was a United States Air Force Captain in the JAG Corps from 1961 to 1963. He was in private practice of law in Duchesne, Utah and Roosevelt, Utah from 1963 to 1973. He was a Duchesne County attorney from 1966 to 1972. He was a Duchesne County Commissioner from 1972 to 1974. He was in private practice of law in Duchesne from 1973 to 1976. He was a District Judge of the Fourth Judicial District of Utah from 1976 to 1985. He was part-time faculty at Brigham Young University from 1977 to 1985.

Federal judicial service

Sam was nominated by President Ronald Reagan on September 9, 1985, to a seat on the United States District Court for the District of Utah vacated by Judge Aldon J. Anderson. He was confirmed by the United States Senate on October 16, 1985, and received commission the same day. He served as Chief Judge from 1997 to 1999. He assumed senior status on November 1, 1999.

References

Sources

1933 births
Living people
Brigham Young University alumni
County commissioners in Ohio
County officials in Ohio
Judges of the United States District Court for the District of Utah
United States district court judges appointed by Ronald Reagan
20th-century American judges
S.J. Quinney College of Law alumni
Utah Republicans
Utah state court judges
American people of Romanian descent
People from Duchesne, Utah
United States Air Force officers
People from Hobart, Indiana
People from Roosevelt, Utah
21st-century American judges
Brigham Young University faculty